Post-silicon validation and debug is the last step in the development of a semiconductor integrated circuit.

Pre-silicon process

During the pre-silicon process, engineers test devices in a virtual environment with sophisticated simulation, emulation, and formal verification tools.  In contrast, post-silicon validation tests occur on actual devices running at-speed in commercial, real-world system boards using logic analyzer and assertion-based tools.

Reasoning

Large semiconductor companies spend millions creating new components; these are the "sunk costs" of design implementation. Consequently, it is imperative that the new chip function in full and perfect compliance to its specification, and be delivered to the market within tight consumer windows. Even a delay of a few weeks can cost tens of millions of dollars. Post-silicon validation is therefore one of the most highly leveraged steps in successful design implementation.

Validation

Chips comprising 500,000 logic elements are the silicon brains inside cell phones, MP3 players, computer printers and peripherals, digital television sets, medical imaging systems, components used in transportation safety and comfort, and even building management systems. Either because of their broad consumer proliferation, or because of their mission-critical application, the manufacturer must be absolutely certain that the device is thoroughly validated.

The best way to achieve high confidence is to leverage the pre-silicon verification work — which can comprise as much as 30% of the overall cost of the implementation — and use that knowledge in the post-silicon system. Today, much of this work is done manually, which partially explains the high costs associated with system validation. However, there are some tools that have been recently introduced to automate post-silicon system validation.

Observability

Simulation-based design environments enjoy the tremendous advantage of nearly perfect observability, meaning the designer can see any signal at nearly any time. They suffer, however, from the restricted amount of data they can generate during post-silicon system validation. Many complicated devices indicate their problems only after days or weeks of testing, and they produce a volume of data that would take centuries to reproduce on a simulator.  FPGA-based emulators, a well-established part of most implementation techniques, are faster than software simulators but will not deliver the comprehensive at-system-speed tests needed for device reliability.

Moreover, the problem of post-silicon validation is getting worse, as design complexity increases because of the terrific advances in semiconductor materials processing. The duration from prototype silicon — so-called "first silicon" — to volume production is increasing, and bugs do escape to the customers. The expense associated with IP-hardening is increasing. The industry today is focused on techniques that allow designers to better amortize their investment in pre-silicon verification to post-silicon validation. The best of these solutions enable affordable, scalable, automated, on-chip wire-scale visibility.

Benefits

Post-silicon validation encompasses all that validation effort that is poured onto a system after the first few silicon prototypes become available, but before product release. While in the past most of this effort was dedicated to validating electrical aspects of the design, or diagnosing systematic manufacturing defects, today a growing portion of the effort focuses on functional system validation. This trend is for the most part due to the increasing complexity of digital systems, which limits the verification coverage provided by traditional pre-silicon methodologies. As a result, a number of functional bugs survive into manufactured silicon, and it is the job of post-silicon validation to detect and diagnose them so that they do not escape into the released system. The bugs in this category are often system-level bugs and rare corner-case situations buried deep in the design state space: since these problems encompass many design modules, they are difficult to identify with pre-silicon tools, characterized by limited scalability and performance.

Post-silicon validation, on the other hand, benefits from very high raw performance, since tests are executed directly on manufactured silicon. At the same time, it poses several challenges to traditional validation methodologies, because of the limited internal observability and difficulty of applying modifications to manufactured silicon chips. These two factors lead in turn to critical challenges in error diagnosis and correction.

See also
Electronic design automation
List of EDA companies
Design flow (EDA)

External links
A New Approach to In-System Silicon Validation and Debug
Validating the Intel Pentium 4 Processor
Improved IP-Centric Post-Silicon Validation Solutions Create A New IP Opportunity
Diagnostics for Design Validation
Electronic circuit verification